Hugh Clair Gillin Jr. (July 14, 1925 – May 4, 2004) was an American film and television actor. Gillin was born in Galesburg, Illinois. He was best known for playing Sheriff John Hunt in Psycho II and III. Gillin has appeared in a total of 75 films and television shows. Gillin last appeared on television in 1998 where he was featured in Pensacola: Wings of Gold in the episode "Not in My Backyard". He was a member of AMPAS, The Academy of Motion Picture Arts and Sciences.

Gillin grew up in Pittsburg, Kansas and attended Pittsburg High School and The University of Kansas. He was a member of the Kansas Jayhawks basketball team in 1947. Gillin received the Purple Heart medal in World War II.

Gillin died on May 4, 2004, in San Diego, California.

Filmography

Film

Television

References

External links 
 
 
 

1925 births
2004 deaths
20th-century American male actors
American male film actors
American male television actors
Male actors from Illinois
People from Galesburg, Illinois
People from Pittsburg, Kansas
University of Kansas alumni